Rishyasringar may refer to:
 Rishyasringar (1941 film), a Tamil-language film
 Rishyasringar (1964 film), an Indian Tamil-language film